Visejec ( or ) is a small village on the right bank of the Krka River in the Municipality of Žužemberk in southeastern Slovenia. The area is part of the historical region of Lower Carniola. The municipality is now included in the Southeast Slovenia Statistical Region. 

The local church is dedicated to Mary Help of Christians and belongs to the Parish of Hinje.

References

External links
Visejec at Geopedia

Populated places in the Municipality of Žužemberk